Hispanic Soul is the debut album released by Puerto Rican singer Vico C released on 1991 by Prime Records. Recorded at Unicornio Studios, the album is credited, along with his previous EP La Recta Final (1990) and Misión La Cima (1990), to take the Hip Hop moviment in Puerto Rico, known as "Rap en Español", from Underground to international exporsure. Eventually, the album reached number ten on US Billboard Tropical/Salsa and was his first album to be officially distributed in Latin America.Following the success of the album, he was nominated for the 1992 Lo Nuestro Awards. 

The track "Bomba Para Afincar" is considered one of Vico C's greatest hits.The song integrates Caribbean rhythms without relinquishing his social messages and is considered to be one of the first musical examples of the evolution of reggae español and the creation of reggaeton.

Track listing

Credits and personnel 
The following credits are from AllMusic and from the Hispanic Soul liner notes:

Charts

References 

 

1991 debut albums
Vico C albums